is a district of Katsushika, Tokyo, Japan.

Education
Katsushika City Board of Education operates area public elementary and junior high schools.

1 and 2 and 4 and 5-chome are zoned to Niijuku Elementary School (新宿小学校). 3-chome 1-28 ban are zoned to Shibahara Elementary School (柴原小学校) while 3-chome 29-33 ban are zoned to Sumiyoshi Elementary School (住吉小学校). The following parts of 6-chome are zoned to the following schools: 1 and 6-ban to Iizuka Elementary School (飯塚小学校), 2-ban to Higashi (East) Kanamachi Elementary School (東金町小学校), and 3-5 and 7-8 ban to Hananoki Elementary School (花の木小学校).

1-5-chome are zoned to Niijuku Junior High School (新宿中学校). 6-chome is zoned to Kanamachi Junior High School (金町中学校).

References

Districts of Katsushika